Kazo is a town in the Western Region of Uganda. It is the capital of Kazo District.

Location
The coordinates of Kazo are 0°03'10.0"S, 30°45'25.0"E (Latitude:-0.052778; Longitude:30.756944).

Infrastructure
The Nyakahita–Kazo–Kamwenge–Fort Portal Road passes through the middle of town.

Population
In 2012, the Uganda Bureau of Statistics projected the population of Kazo Municipality at 10,200.

See also
 List of cities and towns in Uganda

References

Kazo District
Populated places in Western Region, Uganda